Mimbres was an unincorporated community in Luna County, New Mexico, United States.

Notes

Geography of Luna County, New Mexico
Unincorporated communities in New Mexico